The Democratic Liberal Party (PDL) was a liberal-conservative political party in Romania. The party was formed on 15 December 2007, when the Democratic Party (PD) merged with the Liberal Democratic Party (PLD). On 17 November 2014 the PDL officially merged into the National Liberal Party (PNL), ceasing to exist. The PDL was associated with Traian Băsescu, who was previously leader of the PD and President of Romania from 2004 to 2014.

History

Background

The PDL traces its roots in the National Salvation Front (FSN), the governing body which, under the leadership of Ion Iliescu, seized power during the Romanian Revolution of 1989 which ended the previous 42 year-long Communist regime in Romania. Conflicts broke out between FSN leaders Ion Iliescu and Petre Roman in early 1992, and this led to the separation of the Iliescu wing under the name of Democratic National Salvation Front (FDSN), which later became the Social Democratic Party (PSD).

In 1993, the FSN was renamed Democratic Party (PD) and distanced itself from its social-democratic roots to gradually become a centre-right party, whose ideology was transmitted to the PDL.

In advance of the 2004 general election, the PD joined forces with the National Liberal Party (PNL) to create the Justice and Truth Alliance (DA), whose main purpose was to oppose the governing Social Democratic Party (PSD).

Foundation
From mid 2005, the PD's relations with the PNL also became strained. On 15 December 2007, the PD merged into the new Democratic Liberal Party (PDL) along with the Liberal Democratic Party (PLD), a splinter group from the PNL which was led by Theodor Stolojan. The PLD approved the merger in a party congress with 933 votes in favour, six abstentions, and one against.

Government of Emil Boc (2008–2012) and Mihai Răzvan Ungureanu
At the 2008 legislative election, the PDL won the most seats in chambers and formed a new government coalition with the PSD. The two parties fell out in 2009 and the government was replaced by another one including the Democratic Alliance of Hungarians in Romania (UDMR) and the National Union for the Progress of Romania (UNPR).

Later, in 2012, due to massive street protests, Prime Minister Emil Boc resigned and president Traian Băsescu appointed the independent Mihai Răzvan Ungureanu, former SIE commander, to form a new cabinet which was invested by a vote in Parliament in February 2012. After a two-months parliamentary protest, the opposition managed to pass a motion of no confidence on the 5 May 2012, sending the PDL in opposition. When the government fell, Traian Băsescu consulted the parliamentary parties and decided to nominate PSD leader Victor Ponta as Prime Minister.

2012 local elections
On 10 June 2012, local elections were held in Romania. The PDL was able to win only two county council presidents (namely in the counties of Arad and Alba) and 10 major city mayors (Cluj-Napoca, Brașov, Arad, Suceava, Drobeta-Turnu Severin, Alba Iulia, Tulcea, Târgu Mureș, Piatra Neamț, and Târgoviște), which represented a crushing defeat, even if the party accqired 27% of Romania's mayors and almost 23% of the county and local councillors.

Because of these results, the then president of PDL, Emil Boc, resigned and called for an early National Convention (congress) of the party, which was held on the 30 June 2012. The Convention elected Vasile Blaga to become the new party president of the PDL and Gheorghe Flutur as secretary-general.

2012 parliamentary elections
In the run to the parliamentary elections the PDL announced an alliance with the Christian Democratic National Peasants' Party (PNȚ-CD) and Civic Force (FC) to form the Right Romania Alliance (ARD). The alliance was dissolved on 9 December 2013.

2014 European elections
In the 2014 European elections, the PDL received 12.2% of the national vote and returned 5 MEPs.

Merger with the National Liberal Party (PNL)
In late May 2014 the party agreed in principle to a future merger with the National Liberal Party (PNL), and for the two parties to submit a joint candidate for the upcoming 2014 presidential election.

On 17 July 2014 it was announced that the new party formed from a future merger of the PDL and PNL would keep the National Liberal Party name, while being situated in the PDL's existing headquarters in Bucharest and would be registered by the end of 2014. On 26 July 2014, a joint party congress of the PDL and PNL approved the merger. On 28 July 2014 the PDL and PNL formed the Christian Liberal Alliance (ACL) to jointly contest the upcoming presidential election. In the first round of the 2014 presidential election held on 2 November 2014, ACL candidate Klaus Iohannis received 30.4% of the vote, coming in second place behind Victor Ponta, the PSD candidate and incumbent Prime Minister. In the runoff election held on 16 November 2014, Iohannis received 54.5% of the vote, becoming the surprise victory of the Romanian presidency.

Ideology

The PDL's ideology is influenced by liberal conservatism and social conservatism. In this respect the party is a member of the European People's Party (EPP) and the Centrist Democrat International (IDC–CDI).

The PDL supports a consolidation of the free market and is supportive of Romania's flat-rate income tax of 16%. The party also supports reforming the Romanian Constitution in order to bring about a decentralisation in administration and give greater power to the country's eight development regions.

Founding deputies
Shortly before the 2008 legislative election the PDL had 69 deputies, of which
 38 had been elected on Democratic Party (PD) list: Cristian Rǎdulescu, Daniel Buda, Valentin Adrian Iliescu, Costică Canacheu, Gheorghe Albu, Gheorghe Barbu, Cornel Ştefan Bardan, Iulian-Gabriel Bîrsan, Anca-Daniela Boagiu, Ionela Bruchental-Pop, Diana Maria Buşoi, Anca Constantinescu, Radu-Cătălin Drăguş, Stelian Duţu, Elena Ehling, Stelian Fuia, Traian Constantin Igaş, Cristian Ilie, Radu Lambrino, Laurenţiu Mironescu, Liviu Alexandru Miroşeanu, Alexandru Mocanu, Petru Movilă, Ioan Oltean, Constantin Petrea, Marcel Adrian Piteiu, Corneliu Popescu, Cezar Florin Preda, Ioan Dumitru Puchianu, Marius Rogin, Marcel Laurenţiu Romanescu, Valentin Rusu, Petre Străchinaru, Valeriu Tabără, Eugen Constantin Uricec, Mihaela Adriana Vasil, Horia Văsioiu, Iulian Vladu
 14 had been elected on National Liberal Party (PNL) list: Marian Sorin Paveliu, Romică Andreica, Cristian Alexandru Boureanu, Dumitru Gheorghe Mircea Coşea, Marian Hoinaru, Mircea Teodor Iustian, Corneliu Momanu, Viorel Oancea, Dumitru Pardău, Gabriel Sandu, Cornel Ştirbeţ, Raluca Turcan, Petre Ungureanu, Claudius Mihail Zaharia
 10 had been elected on Greater Romania Party (PRM) list: Liviu Almăşan, William Gabriel Brînză, Bogdan Cantaragiu, Petru Călian, Alexandru Ciocâlteu, Liviu Codîrlă, Daniel Ionescu, Dănuţ Liga, Dumitru Puzdrea, Ion Stoica
 6 had been elected on Social Democratic Party (PSD) list: Constantin Amarie, Obuf Cătălin Ovidiu Buhăianu, Viorel Constantinescu, Petru Lificiu, Gheorghe Sârb, Constantin Tudor
 1 had been elected on Conservative Party (PC) list: Graţiela Denisa Iordache

Leadership of PDL

Notable members
 Vasile Blaga, party leader from 2012 to 2014, former Interior Minister;
 Roberta Anastase, MP, President of the Chamber of Deputies;
 Traian Băsescu, President of Romania, membership suspended during his term;
 Radu Berceanu, Senator, former Transport Minister;
 Anca Boagiu, former Minister of European Integration and Transport Minister;
 Emil Boc, Mayor of Cluj-Napoca, party leader (2004–2012), Prime Minister (2008–2012);
 Ioan Oltean, MP;
 Elena Udrea, Minister of Tourism and Regional Development (2008–2012);
 Radu Vasile, former Prime Minister;
 Adriean Videanu, former Mayor of Bucharest and Minister of Economy;
 Monica Macovei, EMP and former Minister of Justice;
 Sulfina Barbu, former Minister of Labour;
 Theodor Stolojan, EMP and former Prime Minister; 
 Raluca Turcan, Deputy Prime Minister of Romania.

Electoral history

Legislative elections

Notes:

1 Right Romania Alliance members: PDL, FC (1 senator and 3 deputies), and PNȚ-CD (1 senator and 1 deputy).

Presidential elections 

Notes:

1 Klaus Iohannis was a member of the PNL, but he was the candidate of the Christian Liberal Alliance (ACL); alliance members: PNL and PDL.

European elections

Notes

References
 Steven D. Roper, Romania: The Unfinished Revolution, Routledge, 2000, 
 Ioan, Scurtu ş.a., "Enciclopedia partidelor politice din România 1859-2003", Editura Meronia, București, 2003.
 Florin-Vasile, Şomlea, "Partidele populare din ţările Uniunii Europene", Editura Cartimpex, Cluj-Napoca, 2007.

External links
  Democratic Liberal Party – Official website

2008 establishments in Romania
Political parties established in 2008
Christian democratic parties in Europe
Eastern Orthodox political parties
Liberal conservative parties
Liberal parties in Romania
Conservative parties in Romania
Member parties of the European People's Party
Political parties disestablished in 2014
National Liberal Party (Romania)